Vasyl Mykhaylovych Betsa (born 28 September 1996) is a Ukrainian professional footballer who plays as a right-back.

References

External links
 
 
 

1996 births
Living people
People from Zakarpattia Oblast
Ukrainian footballers
Association football defenders
FC Hoverla Uzhhorod players
OŠK Slovenský Grob players
FC Mynai players
FC Uzhhorod players
Ukrainian First League players
Ukrainian Second League players
Ukrainian Amateur Football Championship players
Ukrainian expatriate footballers
Expatriate footballers in Slovakia
Ukrainian expatriate sportspeople in Slovakia
Sportspeople from Zakarpattia Oblast